This is a list of academic journals pertaining to the field of philosophy.

Journals in Catalan 
 Filosofia, ara!

Journals in Czech 
 Filosofický časopis
 Reflexe

Journals in Danish 
 Kierkegaard Studies Monograph Series (also in English, French and German)
 Kierkegaard Studies Yearbook (also in English, French and German)

Journals in Dutch 
 Krisis

Journals in English 
 The Acorn
 Acta Philosophica Fennica
 American Catholic Philosophical Quarterly
 American Journal of Bioethics
 The American Journal of Semiotics
 American Philosophical Quarterly
 Analyse & Kritik
 Analysis
 Analytic Philosophy
 Ancient Philosophy
 Angelaki
 Apeiron
 Archiv für Geschichte der Philosophie
 Arendt Studies
 Ars Disputandi
 Augustinian Studies
 Australasian Journal of Philosophy
 Avant: Journal of the Philosophical-Interdisciplinary Vanguard
 Berkeley Studies
 Between the Species
 Bioethics
 Biology and Philosophy
 Biological Theory (journal)
 British Journal for the History of Philosophy
 British Journal for the Philosophy of Science
 British Journal of Aesthetics
 Bulletin of Symbolic Logic
 Business and Professional Ethics Journal
 Business Ethics Quarterly
 Canadian Journal of Philosophy
 Chiasmi International
 The CLR James Journal
 Comparative and Continental Philosophy
 Consciousness and Cognition
 Constellations
 Constructivist Foundations
 Contemporary Political Theory
 Contemporary Pragmatism
 Continent
 Continental Philosophy Review
 Croatian Journal of Philosophy
 Cultura: International Journal of Philosophy of Culture and Axiology
 Deleuze Studies
 Derrida Today
 dialectica
 Dialogue: Canadian Philosophical Review
 Dionysius
 Disputatio
 Environmental Ethics
 Environmental Philosophy
 Epoché
 Erkenntnis
 Essays in the Philosophy of Humanism
 Ethical Theory and Moral Practice
 Ethics
 Ethics & Animals
Ethics and Information Technology
 European Journal of Philosophy
 European Journal of Political Theory
 Existenz
 Faith and Philosophy
 Feminist Philosophy Quarterly
 Film and Philosophy
 Foundations of Physics
 Graduate Faculty Philosophy Journal
 The Harvard Review of Philosophy
 Heidegger Studies
 The Heythrop Journal
 History and Philosophy of the Life Sciences
 Humana.Mente
 Hume Studies
 Hypatia
 Idealistic Studies
 Inquiry: An Interdisciplinary Journal of Philosophy
 Inquiry: Critical Thinking Across the Disciplines
 International Journal of Applied Philosophy
 International Journal of Philosophical Studies
 International Philosophical Quarterly
 International Studies in Philosophy
 Isis
 Journal for General Philosophy of Science
 Journal for the History of Analytical Philosophy
 Journal for Peace and Justice Studies
 The Journal of Aesthetics and Art Criticism
 Journal of Animal Ethics
Journal of Applied Philosophy
 Journal of Business Ethics Education
 Journal of Consciousness Studies
The Journal of Ethics
 Journal of Ethics & Social Philosophy
 Journal of the History of Philosophy
 Journal of Human Values
 Journal of Indian Philosophy
 Journal of Information Ethics
 Journal of Moral Philosophy
 Journal of Philosophical Logic
 Journal of Philosophical Research
 The Journal of Philosophy
 Journal of Scottish Philosophy
Journal of Social Philosophy
 Journal of Speculative Philosophy
 Journal of Symbolic Logic
 The Journal of Theological Studies
 Journal of Value Inquiry
 Kantian Review
 Kriterion - Journal of Philosophy
 Kritike
 The Leibniz Review
 Levinas Studies
 Linguistic and Philosophical Investigations
 Logical Analysis and History of Philosophy
 Metaphilosophy
 Midwest Studies in Philosophy
 Mind
 Mind & Language
 Minds and Machines
 The Modern Schoolman
 The Monist
Moral Philosophy and Politics
 New Nietzsche Studies
 The New Scholasticism
 New Vico Studies
 Noûs
 The Owl of Minerva
 Pacific Philosophical Quarterly
 Philo
 The Philosopher
 Philosophers' Imprint
 The Philosophers' Magazine
 PhiloSOPHIA
Philosophia: Philosophical Quarterly of Israel
 Philosophia Africana
 Philosophia Christi
 Philosophia Mathematica
 Philosophia Reformata
 Philosophical Explorations
 The Philosophical Forum
 Philosophical Inquiry
 Philosophical Investigations
 Philosophical Issues
 Philosophical Papers
 Philosophical Perspectives
 Philosophical Psychology
 The Philosophical Quarterly
 The Philosophical Review
 Philosophical Studies
 Philosophical Topics
 Philosophy
 Philosophy and Phenomenological Research
 Philosophy & Public Affairs
Philosophy & Technology
 Philosophy and Theology
 Philosophy East and West
 Philosophy in the Contemporary World
 Philosophy in Review
 Philosophy Now
 Philosophy of Management
 Philosophy of Science
 Philosophy Today
 Phronesis
 Polish Journal of Philosophy
Politics, Philosophy & Economics
 Praxis Journal of Philosophy
 Proceedings of the American Catholic Philosophical Association
 Proceedings of the American Philosophical Society
 Proceedings of the Aristotelian Society
 Professional Ethics
 Psyche
 Public Affairs Quarterly
 Questions
 Quodlibet
 Radical Philosophy Review
 Ratio
 Res Publica (journal)
 The Review of Metaphysics
 Review of Philosophy and Psychology
 Science & Education: Contributions from history, philosophy, and sociology of science and mathematics
 Semiotica
 Sign Systems Studies
 Social Philosophy Today
 Social Theory and Practice
 Southern Journal of Philosophy
 Studia Neoaristotelica
 Studia Phaenomenologica
 Studies in History and Philosophy of Science
 Synthese
 Teaching Ethics
 Teaching Philosophy
 Techné
 Teorema
 Theoria
 Think
 Thought: Fordham University Quarterly
 Thought: A Journal of Philosophy
 Tulane Studies in Philosophy
 Utilitas

Journals in French 
 Actuel Marx
 Dialogue
 Esprit
 Éthiopiques
 Études Phénoménologiques
 Revue de métaphysique et de morale
 Revue de synthèse
 Revue philosophique de la France et de l'étranger
 Revue Philosophique de Louvain

Journals in German 
 Archiv für Begriffsgeschichte
 Archiv für Geschichte der Philosophie
 Archiv für Rechts- und Sozialphilosophie
 Cultura: International Journal of Philosophy of Culture and Axiology
 Deutsche Zeitschrift für Philosophie
 Grazer Philosophische Studien
 Heidegger Studies
 Kant-Studien
 Kriterion - Journal of Philosophy
 Merkur
 Zeitschrift für allgemeine Wissenschaftstheorie
 Zeitschrift für Philosophie und philosophische Kritik

Journals in Hebrew 
 Iyyun

Journals in Italian 
 Agalma
 Epistemologia

Journals in Polish 
 Avant: Journal of the Philosophical-Interdisciplinary Vanguard

Journals in Portuguese 
 Disputatio
 Lumen Veritatis
 Philosophica

Journals in Spanish 
 Análisis Filosófico
 Anuario Filosófico
 Revista Española de Filosofía Medieval
 Revista Ideas y Valores

Journals in Swedish 
 Filosofisk tidskrift

See also 
 :Category:Philosophical novels
 List of ethics journals
 Lists of academic journals

 
Philosophy journals
Journals